Gordon Begg (14 January 1868 – February 1954) was a Scottish stage and film actor. During the silent film era he made several films in Hollywood, before returning to Britain. He appeared as William Shakespeare in the 1930 British revue film Elstree Calling.

Selected filmography
 The Cost of a Kiss (1917)
 A Sinless Sinner (1919)
 The Harbour Lights (1923)
 The Bandolero (1924)
 His Buddy's Wife (1925)
 The Celestial City (1929)
 Elstree Calling (1930)
 The Officers' Mess (1931)
 Out of the Blue (1931)
 The Sleeping Cardinal (1931)
 Strictly Business (1931)
 The Shadow (1933)
 Princess Charming (1934)
 Dangerous Ground (1934)
 The Night of the Party (1935)
 The Marriage of Corbal (1936)
 Where There's a Will (1936)
 English Without Tears (1944)
 Welcome, Mr. Washington (1944)
 They Knew Mr. Knight (1946)
 Great Expectations (1946)

Bibliography
 Brode, Douglas. Shakespeare in the Movies: From the Silent Era to Shakespeare in Love. Oxford University Press, 2000.
 St. Pierre, Paul Matthew. E.A. Dupont and his Contribution to British Film: Varieté, Moulin Rouge, Piccadilly, Atlantic, Two Worlds, Cape Forlorn. Fairleigh Dickinson University Press, 2010

External links

1868 births
1954 deaths
People from Aberdeen
Male actors from Aberdeen
Scottish male film actors
Scottish male stage actors
Scottish male silent film actors
20th-century Scottish male actors
20th-century British male actors